The following is a list of notable alumni of University High School in Irvine, California. The list includes notable former pupils who attended the school.

Sports
Garrett Atkins - Class of 1997 - former Major League Baseball infielder for the Colorado Rockies and Baltimore Orioles
Jeff Campbell - Class of 1981 - water polo silver medalist, 1988 Summer Olympics
Peter Campbell - Class of 1978 - water polo silver medalist, 1984 Summer Olympics and 1988 Summer Olympics; four-time collegiate All-America
Polly Plumer - Class of 1982 - track and field athlete, former national high school girls' record holder in the mile at 4:35.24, four-time collegiate All-America, Track & Field, UCLA Bruins
Shar Pourdanesh - Class of 1988 - former NFL player (Redskins, Steelers, Raiders); first Iranian-born player
Bojana Todorović - Class of 2009 - NCAA champion beach volleyball player in 2011 at UCLA, former professional volleyball player in France, Puerto Rico and the Philippines
Tim Wallach - Class of 1975 - former Major League Baseball player and Los Angeles Dodgers hitting coach
Amy White - Class of 1986 - silver medalist in the 100M backstroke, 1984 Summer Olympics
Greg Whiteley - Class of 1985 - five-time NCAA all-American and winner of NCAA championship indoor mile

Music
Joey Allen (Joe Cagle) - Class of 1982 - lead guitarist for the 1980s hard rock/glam metal band Warrant
Eddie Breckenridge - Class of 1998 - bass guitarist of hardcore punk band Thrice
Riley Breckenridge - Class of 1993 - drummer of hardcore punk band Thrice
Tim Commerford - Class of 1986 - bassist of rap metal band Rage Against the Machine, former bassist of Audioslave
Zack de la Rocha - Class of 1988 - lead singer of rap metal band Rage Against the Machine
Murphy Karges - Class of 1985 - bassist of alternative rock band Sugar Ray
Martin Leung - Class of 2004 - video game pianist
Vanness Wu - Class of 1996 - Taiwanese singer, actor, director and producer member of JVKV

Film and theater
Omid Abtahi - Class of 1997 - actor
Justin Chon - Class of 1999 - actor
David Engel - Class of 1977 - Broadway theatre/Off-Broadway singer and dancer best known for originating roles in the musicals Forever Plaid, La Cage aux Folles, and Seussical
Will Ferrell - Class of 1986 - Hollywood actor and former Saturday Night Live cast member
Robert MacNaughton - Class of 1984 - Hollywood actor best known for his role as Michael in the movie E.T. the Extra-Terrestrial
Cady McClain - Class of 1987 - actress, The Young and the Restless; formerly "Dixie" on All My Children and "Rosanna" on As the World Turns
Nicole Parker - Class of 1996 - MadTV cast member and comedian, Broadway actress
Nasim Pedrad - Class of 1999 - Persian-American comedian and former Saturday Night Live cast member
Eran Raven - Class of 1990 - aka Eran Feigenbaum, Master Mentalist on NBC's Phenomenon
Gary Riley - Class of 1985 - Hollywood actor best known for his role as Charlie Hogan in the movie Stand by Me
Sotaro Yasuda - Class of 2004 - Japanese American actor, played Ken Hisatsu in the 2007 Super Sentai series

Business 

 Mike Cagney - Class of 198? - Co-Founder and CEO of FIgure, Co-Founder and former CEO of SoFi

Journalism and academia
David J. R. Frakt - Class of 1987 - law professor
Ezra Klein - Class of 2002 - Vox website founder and editor-in-chief; formerly Washington Post columnist and blogger, Newsweek columnist and MSNBC contributor
Sudhir Alladi Venkatesh - Class of 1984 - sociologist and urban ethnographer

Other
Barbara Edwards - Class of 1978 - Playboy Playmate of the Year 1984
Dita Von Teese - Class of 1990 - aka Heather Sweet, burlesque star and fashion model, divorced from Marilyn Manson
Yoo Yoonjin - Class of 2010 - aka Jinnytty, Twitch streamer and YouTuber

References

Alumni by high school in Orange County, California
University High School (Irvine, California)
University High School